Servins is a commune in the Pas-de-Calais department in the Hauts-de-France region of France.

Geography

Population

Places of interest
 The church of St.Martin, dating from the eighteenth century.
 Hannedouche chapel

See also
Communes of the Pas-de-Calais department

References

External links

 Official town website 
 Website of the Communaupole de Lens-Liévin

Communes of Pas-de-Calais
Artois